Ancien may refer to
 the French word for "ancient, old"
 Société des anciens textes français
 the French for "former, senior"
 Virelai ancien
 Ancien Régime
 Ancien Régime in France